Constant Future is the fifth full-length release from Parts & Labor, released in 2011 on Jagjaguwar Records.

Track listing
"Fake Names"
"Outnumbered"
"Constant Future"
"A Thousand Roads"
"Rest"
"Pure Annihilation"
"Skin And Bones"
"Echo Chamber"
"Without A Seed"
"Bright White"
"Hurricane"
"Never Changer"

Reception

Pitchfork Media (7.6/10) 8 March 2011

2011 albums
Parts & Labor albums